Hooked! Real Motion Fishing is a fishing video game for the Wii video game console, released on October 30, 2007. The game supports Nintendo Wi-Fi Connection and comes with a free fishing rod attachment with the game's purchase. Hooked! Real Motion Fishing is the localized version of Bass Fishing Wii: Rokumaru Densetsu in Japan. In Europe, the game is called Big Catch Bass Fishing, which is also the name given to an otherwise unrelated Nintendo DS fishing game developed by Starfish-SD.

Players fish in 6 locations using 4 casting methods. Allows online play with up to 4 people.

This game was developed by SIMS, the developer of several fishing games including Sega Marine Fishing, the Dreamcast version of Sega Bass Fishing, and Top Angler: Real Bass Fishing.

References

External links
Official Bass Fishing Wii: Rokumaru Densetsu Website

2007 video games
Fishing video games
Wii-only games
Wii Wi-Fi games
Nintendo Wi-Fi Connection games
Video games developed in Japan
SIMS Co., Ltd. games
505 Games games
Multiplayer and single-player video games
Arc System Works games